Jaime Miguel Moreno Garavilla (born 25 December 1957) is a Mexican lawyer and politician affiliated with the Institutional Revolutionary Party. He was a federal deputy of the LVII and LIX Legislatures of the Mexican Congress as a plurinominal representative, as well as a local deputy in the Legislative Assembly of the Federal District.

References

1957 births
Living people
Politicians from Mexico City
20th-century Mexican lawyers
Members of the Chamber of Deputies (Mexico)
Institutional Revolutionary Party politicians
20th-century Mexican politicians
21st-century Mexican politicians
Members of the Congress of Mexico City
Deputies of the LIX Legislature of Mexico